Euxoa intolerabilis is a moth of the family Noctuidae. It is found in Siberia, Tibet and China.

External links
Noctuinae (Noctuidae) collection of Siberian Zoological Museum

Euxoa
Moths described in 1902
Moths of Asia